Ramsaday College, established in 1946, is one of the oldest undergraduate colleges in Amta, in Howrah district, India. It is affiliated with the University of Calcutta.

Departments

Science

Chemistry
Physics
Mathematics
Computer Science
Zoology
Botany
Food & Nutrition
Anthropology
Physiology
Economics

Arts and Commerce

Bengali
English
Sanskrit
History
Political Science
Philosophy
Education
Sociology
Commerce

Accreditation
Ramsaday College is recognized by the University Grants Commission (UGC). Recently, it has been re-accredited and awarded B grade by the National Assessment and Accreditation Council (NAAC).

See also 
List of colleges affiliated to the University of Calcutta
Education in India
Education in West Bengal

References

External links
Ramsaday College

Educational institutions established in 1946
University of Calcutta affiliates
Universities and colleges in Howrah district
1946 establishments in India